This is a list of diplomatic missions of North Korea.

In the Cold War era its foreign policy was focused on the Soviet bloc countries, while it actively courted allies in the developing world.  This was more out of political necessity, as North Korea competed with South Korea for diplomatic recognition. Eventually countries began recognizing both governments on the Korean Peninsula, and North Korea's missions in the developing world are more concerned with running aid programs and maintaining political mileage than obtaining any economic benefits.

Africa

 Algiers (Embassy)

 Luanda (Embassy)

 Kinshasa (Embassy)

 Cairo (Embassy)

 Malabo (Embassy)

 Addis Ababa (Embassy)

 Conakry (Embassy)

Tripoli (Embassy)

 Abuja (Embassy)

 Pretoria (Embassy)

 Dar es Salaam (Embassy)

 Kampala (Embassy)

Americas

 Brasília (Embassy)

 Havana (Embassy)
 
 Mexico City (Embassy)

 Caracas (Embassy)

Asia

 Dhaka (Embassy)

 Phnom Penh (Embassy)

Beijing (Embassy)
 Hong Kong (Consulate-General)
 Shenyang (Consulate-General)

 New Delhi (Embassy)

 Jakarta (Embassy)

 Tehran (Embassy)

Tokyo: General Association of Korean Residents in Japan (Chongryon)

 Kuwait City (Embassy)

 Vientiane (Embassy)

 Ulaanbaatar (Embassy)

 Yangon (Embassy)

 Kathmandu (Embassy)

Islamabad (Embassy)
 Karachi  (Consulate-General)

 Singapore (Embassy)

 Damascus (Embassy)

 Bangkok (Embassy)

 Hanoi (Embassy)

 Sana'a (Embassy)

Europe

 Vienna (Embassy)

 Minsk (Embassy)

 Sofia (Embassy)

 Prague (Embassy)

 Berlin (Embassy)

 Rome (Embassy)

 Warsaw (Embassy)

 Bucharest (Embassy)

 Moscow (Embassy)
 Nizhny Novgorod (Consulate-General)
 Nakhodka (Consulate-General)
 Khabarovsk (Consular Office)

Madrid (Embassy)

 Stockholm (Embassy)

 Bern (Embassy)

 London (Embassy)

Multinational organizations
 
Geneva (Permanent Mission)
New York City (Permanent Mission)
 
Paris (Permanent Mission)

Gallery

Closed missions

Africa

Americas

Asia

Europe

Oceania

See also
 Foreign relations of North Korea
 List of diplomatic missions in North Korea

References

 
Korea, North
Diplomatic missions